Robert Pascarel (30 December 1888 – 14 April 1962) was a French athlete. He competed in the men's pole vault at the 1908 Summer Olympics.

References

1888 births
1962 deaths
Athletes (track and field) at the 1908 Summer Olympics
French male pole vaulters
Olympic athletes of France
Place of birth missing